Schnackenburg is a surname of German origin, originating as a surname for someone from the town of Schnackenburg. Notable people with the surname include:

Hellmut Schnackenburg (1902-1974), German conductor and music director
Rudolf Schnackenburg (1914-2002), German priest and scholar

See also
Schnackenburg, a town in Lower Saxony, Germany
Schnackenberg